An anatomical model is a three-dimensional representation of human or animal anatomy, used for medical and biological education.

Model specs
The model may show the anatomy partially dissected, or have removable parts allowing the student to remove and inspect the modelled body parts. Some models may have changeable genital inserts and other interchangeable parts which permit a unisex model to represent an individual of either sex.

Although 3D computer models of anatomy now exist as an alternative, physical anatomical models still have advantages in providing insight into anatomy.

See also
 Anatomy
 Comparative anatomy

References

External links

Physical models
Anatomy
Medical education
History of anatomy
Sculpture